Paul Morrison (22 July 1952 – 30 June 2011) was  a former Australian rules footballer who played with Richmond in the Victorian Football League (VFL).

Notes

External links 		
		
		
		
		
		
		
		
1952 births		
2011 deaths		
Australian rules footballers from Victoria (Australia)		
Richmond Football Club players